Nir Moshe (lit. Moshe's Meadow) is a moshav in southern Israel with an elevation of 145 m from sea level. Located in the north-western Negev south-east of Sderot with an area of 2,000 dunams, it falls under the jurisdiction of Merhavim Regional Council.

History
The moshav was established in 1953 by former city dwellers from Jerusalem, Haifa and Herzliya, and was initially named Shoval Mizrachi 1, before being renamed after Moshe Smiliansky, an author and agronomist.

References

External links
Official website

Moshavim
Populated places established in 1953
Populated places in Southern District (Israel)
1953 establishments in Israel